Smith Elementary School or Smith Elementary may refer to the following elementary schools: 

 Smith Elementary in Aurora, Illinois, part of West Aurora Public School District 129.
 Smith Elementary in Austin, Texas, part of Del Valle Independent School District.
 Smith Elementary in Berea, Ohio, a former school part of Berea City School District.
 Smith Elementary in Owasso, Oklahoma, part of Owasso Public Schools.